Chandanmatti is a village in Dharwad district of Karnataka, India.

Demographics 
As of the 2011 Census of India there were 322 households in Chandanmatti and a total population of 1,330 consisting of 694 males and 636 females. There were 186 children ages 0-6.

References

Villages in Dharwad district